Spruce Falls was the local name for a small waterfall where the Swan River empties into Duck Lake in northeastern Saskatchewan, near the Manitoba boundary. It is located at 55°37′ N and 102°7′ W.

The water eventually flows into the Churchill River. It has a drainage area of  consisting of a number of lakes, chief among which are Mari Lake, Barrier Lake, and Birch Burntwood Lake, . 

In 1928, Spruce Falls became the site of a temporary power plant supplying the Island Falls, Saskatchewan hydroelectric power development on the Churchill River.

Spruce Falls and the Island Falls Power Development

A large amount of power is required for construction purposes on a job the size of the Island Falls development. As steam and gasoline units could be used only to a minor extent, owing to the high cost of transporting fuel, the only alternative was to find a site where hydroelectric energy could be generated.

The powerhouse

The Spruce Falls temporary powerhouse was a frame building on the shore of Sisipuk Lake. It contained two small generating units and complementary equipment. These two  vertical-type turbines, with propeller-type runners, were directly connected to 1,000 kV⋅A generators delivering power at 600 volts, 3 phase, 60 cycles to a bank of transformers.

The transformer bank was placed apart from the power-house and protected by a lightning arrester and fuses. Rated at 2,000 kV⋅A, these transformers stepped the voltage up to 26,400 volts for transmission to Island Falls. There, a sub-station stepped the current down to 600 volts for two motor-generator sets which supplied current for the electric locomotives used in hauling earth, concrete and other construction materials.

Completion of the project

Work on the temporary power plant was started on October 4, 1928. Its operation began on March 20, 1929, and continued without interruption until No. 1 Unit at Island Falls took up the load on June 5, 1930. Subsequently, the Spruce Falls plant was dismantled, and, under very difficult freighting conditions due to snow and weak ice, the two small generating units were brought to Island Falls, where they were permanently installed in 1933.

During the period of operation this plant supplied 4,698,000 kWh of electrical energy for construction purposes, at an average cost of 4.35 cents per kilowatt-hour.

Notes

  A dry season in 1929 resulted in low water level in 1930 and it became necessary to find additional sources of water in order to maintain the amount of power required for construction. The outlet of Barrier Lake was cut through, and its  of water was lowered  in order to furnish enough power to complete the construction at Island Falls. After construction, the outlet was replaced by a faced, rock-filled, timber-crib weir, thus restoring Barrier Lake to its former elevation.

References

Marshall, M.H. Power Development at Island Falls, Churchill River, a paper presented at the Calgary Branch of The Engineering Institute of Canada, January 29, 1931.
Davis, R.W. and Huffaker, M.F. Island Falls Power Development on the Churchill River, a paper presented at the annual general meeting of the Canadian Institute of Mining and Metallurgy, Winnipeg, MB, March, 1935.

Waterfalls of Saskatchewan